Marksistskaya is a station of the Moscow Metro's Kalininsko-Solntsevskaya Line. It was opened along with the initial segment on 30 December 1979. The station is named after the Marksistskaya (Marxist) Street and its architectural theme is the purity of Marxist ideals.

Architects Nina Alyoshina, V. Volovich and N. Samoylova took a standard deep level column tri-vault station (engineers Ye. Barsky, I. Zhukov and Yu. Muromtsev) and applied on overall red theme that includes red Burovshina marble to the columns and a pink Gazgan to the station walls. The spiral-shaped light fixtures symbolize "spiral development", a concept in dialectical materialism, the Marxist philosophical teaching.

The station serves as a transfer point between the Taganskaya station of the Koltsevaya Line and the Taganskaya station of the Tagansko-Krasnopresnenskaya Line forming a busy three station transfer point. Transfer to the former is by the direct escalator from the end of Marksistskaya.

The station is located on the eastern edge of the Taganka Square, and its underground vestibule is situated on the influx of the Taganskaya and Marksistskaya streets into the square with surface subway access available to both sides of the latter street and to the open plaza on the apex of their connection.

It was the deepest station in Moscow Metro from 1979 until 1987.

External links

 Moskovsky Metropoliten-Description and photographs
 News.Metro.ru-Description and photographs
 Metro.ru-Description and photographs
 Metrowalks.ru-Photographs
 KartaMetro.info — Station location and exits on Moscow map

References 

Moscow Metro stations
Railway stations in Russia opened in 1979
Kalininsko-Solntsevskaya line
Railway stations located underground in Russia